In mathematical logic, a set  of logical formulae is deductively closed if it contains every formula  that can be logically deduced from , formally: if  always implies .

Examples 
In propositional logic, the set of all true propositions is deductively closed. This is to say that only true statements are derivable from other true statements.

Epistemic closure 

In epistemology, many philosophers have and continue to debate whether particular subsets of propositions—especially ones ascribing knowledge or justification of a belief to a subject—are closed under deduction.

References

Concepts in logic
Closure
Logical consequence
Propositional calculus
Set theory